The 2007 Huntingdonshire District Council election took place on 3 May 2007 to elect members of Huntingdonshire District Council in Cambridgeshire, England. One third of the council was up for election and the Conservative Party stayed in overall control of the council.

After the election, the composition of the council was:
Conservative 39
Liberal Democrats 11
Independent 2

Background
19 seats on the council were contested at the election, with the Conservatives controlling the council before the election with 40 of the 52 seats. A number of sitting councillors stood down at the election including Conservatives Jean Chandler (Fenstanton ward) and Nick Guyatt, and Liberal Democrat Shirley Menczer (Brampton ward).

As well as candidates from the Conservative, Liberal Democrat and Labour parties, there were also Green Party candidates in the 3 Huntingdon wards, a British National Party candidate in St Neots Eynesbury and a UK Independence Party candidate in Upwood and The Raveleys. Meanwhile, the only councillor to have served since the council was founded in 1974, Conservative Mike Newman, stood again in Somersham ward.

Election result
The Conservatives suffered a net lose of 1 seat, after losing 2 seats to the Liberal Democrats, but also gaining 1 seat. This meant the Conservatives stayed in control of the council with 39 councillors, compared to 11 for the Liberal Democrats and 2 independents. One of the 2 Liberal Democrat gains came in Huntingdon North, where 19-year-old Sam Kemp took the seat by 19 votes from Conservative Maggie Wheeler.

Ward results

References

2007 English local elections
2007
2000s in Cambridgeshire